Samuel Green may refer to:

Samuel Green (printer) (1614–1702), American printer
Samuel Green (organ builder) (1740–1796), English organ builder
Samuel Green (criminal) (1796–1822), American serial killer and robber
Samuel Green (freedman) (c. 1802–1877), American freed slave, jailed in 1857 for possessing a copy of the novel Uncle Tom's Cabin
Samuel Swett Green (1837–1918), founder of the American Library Association
Samuel Green (Klansman) (1890–1949), Ku Klux Klan leader in the 1940s
Samuel Green (poet) (born 1948), Poet Laureate, 2007-9, of the State of Washington
Samuel Green (politician) South Carolina Representative and Senator
Samuel Abbott Green (1830–1919), mayor of Boston
Samuel Adams Green (1940–2011), art director
Samuel Fisk Green (1822–1884), American medical missionary
Samuel Gosnell Green (1822–1905), English Baptist minister and author
Samuel Green (priest) (1882–1929), British Army chaplain
Samuel Green Jr. (1927–2016), pastor and bishop in the Church of God in Christ
Sam Green, documentary filmmaker
Sam Green (councillor), an openly-gay man elected to Durham City Council in 1972
Sam Green (born 1947), pseudonym for Juval Aviv, novelist

See also
Samuel Greene (1839–1884), U.S. Navy officer